Presidential elections were held in Djibouti for the first time on 12 June 1981. Earlier in the year, the country had been declared a one-party state with the People's Rally for Progress as the only legally permitted party. RPP leader Hassan Gouled Aptidon, who had been president since independence in 1977, was the sole candidate on the ballot, and was re-elected with 84.58% of the total votes cast.

Results

References

Djibouti
1981 in Djibouti
Presidential elections in Djibouti
One-party elections
Single-candidate elections
June 1981 events in Africa
Election and referendum articles with incomplete results